Lacave is a commune of France, situated in the North-West of the Lot department, within the Occitanie region.

Geography

Situated in the foothills of the "Causse de Gramat" at the confluence of the Dordogne and the Ouysse, 12 km from Souillac and 8 km from Rocamadour.

History

Inhabited since the time of the Solutrean and Magdalenian cultures of the Paleolithic era.

Administration

Population
At the start of the 20th century, Lacave had 519 inhabitants "with just 27 concentrated in the main town".

See also
Communes of the Lot department

References

Communes of Lot (department)